Zapuže is a small settlement northwest of Orehovica in the Municipality of Šentjernej in southeastern Slovenia. The entire municipality is part of the traditional region of Lower Carniola and is now included in the Southeast Slovenia Statistical Region.

References

External links
Zapuže on Geopedia

Populated places in the Municipality of Šentjernej